Petchsila Wor.Auracha is a Thai Muay Thai fighter and the current WMO World Champion.

Biography and career
Petchsila started his Bangkok career training at the MTM academy, in 2019 he became the first fighter in the history of his camp to fight for a title when he was matched with Yoddkla Isantrakter by the Petchyindee promotion for the True4U 108 lbs title on November 1 at Lumpinee Stadium. He won the fight by decision.

On December 8, 2019, Petchsila traveled to Japan to compete for the vacant WPMF World Light Flyweight title at the Battle Of Muaythai SEASON II vol.6 event. He defeated the reigning Rajadamnern Stadium Mini Flyweight champion Ryuya Okuwaki by majority decision to become the new world champion at only 15 years old.

Back in Thailand Petchsila had an impressive 2020 showing with six wins, two by way of knockout and only one defeat which he avenged. This success made him notable on the circuit, opening him to competition against top ranked fighters.

On March 12, 2021, Petchsila faced an established Thai champion for the first time when he met Praewprao PetchyindeeAcademy at Rangsit Stadium. Petchsila overcame the pre-fight odds and defeated the former Rajadamnern Stadium champion by decision in a fierce bout. On September 30, Petchsila was matched with the #1 ranked fighter in the division and reigning WMO World Champion Satanmuanglek PetchyindeeAcademy at a Petchyindee promotion event in the Buriram Province. Petchsila shocked the observers winning once again by decision.

On November 11, 2021, faced Chokpanalan Por. Lakboon in a rising prospect showdown, both fighters having won nine of their last ten fights. Petchsila won via fourth-round knockout with an elbow strike and was announced as one of the favorites to win the Fighter of the Year award.

As of November 2021 he was ranked the #1 Flyweight contender in the world by both the World Boxing Council Muaythai and the World Muay Thai Organization.

For his results during the year 2021 Petchsila was voted runner-up Fighter of the Year by the Sports Authority of Thailand. He received 15 votes against 18 in favor of Lamnamoonlek Tded99.

Petchsila was booked to face the former WBC Muay Thai and Omnoi Stadium champion Kumandoi PetchyindeeAcademy on March 10, 2022, at the Rajadamnern Stadium for both the True4u and Rajadamnern Stadium 115 lbs titles. Petchsila lost the fight by decision.

Titles and accomplishments
World Professional Muaythai Federation
 2019 WPMF World Light Flyweight Champion
True4 Muaymanwansuk
 2019 True4U 108 lbs Champion
 2021 True4U 115 lbs Champion (1 defense)
World Muaythai Organization
 2022 WMO World 122 lbs Champion
Awards
 2021 Thailand Sports Authority Fighter of the Year runner-up
 2021 World Muaythai Organization Male Fighter of the Year
 2021 Sports Writers Association of Thailand Young Fighter of the Year

Fight record

|-  style="background:#cfc;"
| 2023-03-18|| Win ||align=left| Kaenkaew Sor.Boonmeerit || Muayded Sangwienduad, OrTorGor.3 Stadium || Nonthaburi province, Thailand || Decision || 5 || 3:00
|-  style="background:#fbb;"
| 2023-01-28|| Loss ||align=left| Seeoui Singmawynn ||Suek Muay Mahakuson Samakom Chao Paktai + Suek Muayded Sangwienduad || Bangkok, Thailand || Decision || 5 || 3:00

|-  style="background:#fbb;"
| 2022-10-22|| Loss ||align=left| Saotho Or.Atchariya ||Muay Thai Rakya Soosakon  || Maha Sarakham province || KO (Elbow)||  3||  

|-  style="background:#cfc;"
| 2022-09-08|| Win ||align=left| Kumandoi PetchyindeeAcademy ||Petchyindee, Rajadamnern Stadium || Bangkok, Thailand || Decision (Unanimous)|| 5 || 3:00 
|-
! style=background:white colspan=9 |

|-  style="background:#cfc;"
| 2022-07-12 || Win||align=left| Chatchai Dabrunsarakam ||Petchyindee, Rajadamnern Stadium || Bangkok, Thailand || KO (Left elbow) || 4 ||2:47 
|-  style="background:#fbb;"
| 2022-06-20 || Loss ||align=left| Phetsommai Sor.Sommai  || U-Muay RuamJaiKonRakMuayThai + Palangmai, Rajadamnern Stadium || Bangkok, Thailand || Decision || 5 || 3:00
|-  style="background:#fbb;"
| 2022-05-12 || Loss ||align=left| Saoek Or.Atchariya ||Petchyindee, Rajadamnern Stadium || Bangkok, Thailand || Decision || 5 || 3:00
|-
! style=background:white colspan=9 |

|-  style="background:#cfc;"
| 2022-04-21 || Win ||align=left| Puenkon Tor.Surat ||Petchyindee, Rajadamnern Stadium || Bangkok, Thailand || Decision || 5 || 3:00
|-  style="background:#fbb;"
| 2022-03-10 || Loss ||align=left| Kumandoi PetchyindeeAcademy ||Petchyindee, Rajadamnern Stadium || Bangkok, Thailand || Decision || 5 ||3:00
|-
! style=background:white colspan=9 |

|-  style="background:#cfc;"
| 2022-01-28|| Win ||align=left| Oleylek Sor.Kianjai ||Petchyindee Muaymanwansuk, Rangsit Stadium || Rangsit, Thailand ||Decision (unanimous) || 5 ||3:00
|-
! style=background:white colspan=9 |

|-  style="background:#cfc;"
| 2021-12-24|| Win ||align=left| Chokpanlan Por.Lakboon  || Petchyindee True4U Muaymanwansuk, Rangsit Stadium|| Rangsit, Thailand || Decision  || 5 || 3:00
|-
! style=background:white colspan=9 |

|-  style="background:#cfc;"
| 2021-11-11|| Win ||align=left| Chokpanlan Por.Lakboon  || Petchyindee + Muay Thai Moradok Kon Thai|| Buriram Province, Thailand || KO (left elbow) || 4 ||

|-  style="background:#cfc;"
| 2021-09-30|| Win ||align=left| Satanmuanglek PetchyindeeAcademy || Petchyindee|| Buriram, Thailand || Decision || 5 ||3:00

|-  style="background:#cfc;"
| 2021-03-12|| Win||align=left| Praewprao PetchyindeeAcademy || True4U Muaymanwansuk, Rangsit Stadium || Rangsit, Thailand || Decision || 5 || 3:00

|-  style="background:#cfc;"
| 2020-11-20|| Win||align=left| Mahasamut Moopingaroichungbey|| Muaymanwansuk, Rangsit Stadium || Rangsit, Thailand || Decision || 5 || 3:00

|-  style="background:#cfc;"
| 2020-10-23|| Win||align=left| Fourwil Sitjaroensap|| Muaymanwansuk, Rangsit Stadium || Rangsit, Thailand || Decision || 5 || 3:00

|-  style="background:#cfc;"
| 2020-10-09|| Win||align=left| Dinnuetong Dabpong191|| Muaymanwansuk, Rangsit Stadium || Rangsit, Thailand || TKO (Doctor Stoppage) || 3 ||

|-  style="background:#cfc;"
| 2020-09-04|| Win||align=left| Kongburapha Thiptamai|| Muaymanwansuk, Rangsit Stadium || Rangsit, Thailand || KO (Knee to the body) || 3 ||

|-  style="background:#fbb;"
| 2020-07-10|| Loss||align=left| Kongburapha Thiptamai|| Muaymanwansuk, Rangsit Stadium || Rangsit, Thailand || Decision || 5 || 3:00

|-  style="background:#cfc;"
| 2020-02-20|| Win||align=left| Dechpet Sakwichian || Petchyindee, Rajadamnern Stadium || Bangkok, Thailand || Decision || 5 || 3:00

|-  style="background:#cfc;"
| 2020-01-24|| Win||align=left| Phetdet Sakwichian || Sirilak Muay Thai, Lumpinee Stadium || Bangkok, Thailand || Decision || 5 || 3:00

|-  style="text-align:center; background:#cfc;"
| 2019-12-08|| Win ||align=left| Ryuya Okuwaki || BOM 2-6 - Battle Of Muaythai SEASON II vol.6 || Tokyo, Japan || Decision (Majority) || 5 || 3:00
|-
! style=background:white colspan=9 |

|-  style="background:#cfc;"
| 2019-11-01|| Win||align=left| Yoddkla Isantrakter || Muay Thai T1, Lumpinee Stadium || Bangkok, Thailand || Decision || 5 || 3:00
|-
! style=background:white colspan=9 |

|-  style="background:#cfc;"
| 2019-09-23|| Win||align=left| BoyUbon Ansukhumwit || Petchyindee, Rajadamnern Stadium || Bangkok, Thailand || Decision || 5 || 3:00

|-  style="background:#fbb;"
| 2019-08-08|| Loss ||align=left| Detphet Wor.Sangprapai || Wanmeechai, Rajadamnern Stadium || Bangkok, Thailand || TKO (Punches) || 2 ||

|-  style="background:#fbb;"
| 2019-03-26|| Loss ||align=left| Komkiat Kiatfoofueng || Kiatpetch,  Channel 7 Stadium || Bangkok, Thailand || Decision || 5 || 3:00

|-  style="background:#cfc;"
| 2019-02-10|| Win||align=left| Phetsaeksan Thungpananyangthong || Channel 7 Stadium || Bangkok, Thailand || Decision || 5 || 3:00

|-  style="background:#fbb;"
| 2018-11-09|| Loss ||align=left| Rachadet TN Muaythai || Phetkiatpetch, Lumpinee Stadium || Bangkok, Thailand || Decision || 5 || 3:00

|-  style="background:#cfc;"
| 2018-08-31|| Win||align=left| Mahasamut Tor.Piewlopakdee || Phetkiatpetch, Lumpinee Stadium || Bangkok, Thailand || Decision || 5 || 3:00

|-  style="background:#cfc;"
| 2018-08-07|| Win||align=left| Thudsakan Rakchat || Phetkiatpetch, Lumpinee Stadium || Bangkok, Thailand || Decision || 5 || 3:00

|-  style="background:#cfc;"
| 2018-04-29|| Win||align=left| Petch-Aek Kiatjamroon ||Channel 7 Stadium || Bangkok, Thailand || Decision || 5 || 3:00

|-  style="background:#cfc;"
| 2018-02-04|| Win||align=left| Prakaipetch Mupingaroichungbey || Jitmuangnon Stadium || Nonthaburi province, Thailand || KO || 2 ||

|-
| colspan=9 | Legend:

References

Petchsila Wor.Auracha
Living people
2004 births
Petchsila Wor.Auracha